"My Home" is a traditional Scottish or Northumbrian pipe tune. It is used by military bands as a march past, but a slow march contrasting with quick march pasts such as "Highland Laddie".

Recordings
 1956 Jack Armstrong on Northumbrian Pipe Music 
 1964 The Gordon Highlanders Military Band and Pipe and Drum Corps 
 1969 The Pipes And Drums Of The Tenth Princess Mary's Own Gurkha Rifles

References

Compositions for bagpipe
Scottish songs
British military marches
Scottish Highland dances
Scots Guards